Ajjampura is a town and taluk headquarters  in the district of Chikmagalur district in the Indian state of Karnataka.

Ajjampura has a police sub-inspector's office, one movie theatre, a veterinary hospital and the Amrit Mahal cattle breeding station.
It has a famous temple called rajarajeshwari temple.

History
Although not much is known about the history of this town, it is believed that the place was originally known as "Keral". An account of this was found in "Mysore: A Gazetteer Compiled for Government by Benjamin Lewis Rice" (First published in London in 1887). The image shows an entry from this Gazetteer.

Education 
Ajjampura has a Government Pre-University College for 11th and 12th Standard students. It is located at the Gandhi Circle of Ajjampura. The college is named after the donor of the land, Shetru Siddappa, and is called Govt. Setru Siddappa Pre University College. Ajjampura is affiliated with the Government First Grade College which is a constituent college of Kuvempu University, Shankaraghatta, Karnataka, India.

External links
Railway network map of Ajjampura Railway Station

References

Cities and towns in Chikkamagaluru district